The 2018 UEFA Super Cup was the 43rd edition of the UEFA Super Cup, an annual football match organised by UEFA and contested by the reigning champions of the two main European club competitions, the UEFA Champions League and the UEFA Europa League. The match featured two Spanish sides, Real Madrid, the winners of the 2017–18 UEFA Champions League and the defending champions having won the previous two editions, and Atlético Madrid, the winners of the 2017–18 UEFA Europa League. It was played at the Lilleküla Stadium in Tallinn, Estonia, on 15 August 2018, and was the first European club final held in Estonia.

In March 2018, UEFA announced that a fourth substitution would be allowed in extra time and that the number of substitutes had been increased from 7 to 12. The kick-off time was also changed from 20:45 CEST to 21:00 CEST.

Atlético Madrid won the match 4–2 after extra time for their third UEFA Super Cup title.

Teams

This was the fifth all-Spanish Super Cup, and the fourth in the last five years. This was also the first Super Cup to be played by two teams from the same city. A Spanish side has appeared in the Super Cup for nine of the previous ten years. Additionally, as both teams are from Spain, the Super Cup was guaranteed to be won by a Spanish team for the ninth time in ten seasons and for five consecutive years.

Real Madrid were aiming to win their fifth Super Cup, which would tie them with record-holders Barcelona and Milan, while having won the last two editions, have the chance to become the first team to win three consecutive Super Cups. On the other hand, Atlético Madrid, having won the previous two Super Cups they played in, had the chance to become the first team to win their first three Super Cups.

This was the tenth Madrid Derby match in European competitions, with all previous nine matches having been in the European Cup/UEFA Champions League. Real Madrid held the advantage with 5 wins, 2 draws and 2 defeats, and have never been knocked out by Atlético Madrid either over two legs or in a one-match decider.

Venue

The Lilleküla Stadium was announced as the final venue on 15 September 2016, following the decision of the UEFA Executive Committee meeting in Athens, Greece. The stadium was known as the "Lilleküla Arena" due to UEFA's sponsorship regulations.

Pre-match

Ticketing
With a stadium capacity of 13,000 for the match, around 70% of the tickets were available to fans and the general public, available for sale to fans worldwide via UEFA.com from 5 to 26 June 2018 in three price categories: €130, €90, and €50. The remaining tickets were allocated to the local organising committee, UEFA and national associations, commercial partners and broadcasters.

Match

Officials
On 2 August 2018, UEFA announced that Szymon Marciniak of Poland would officiate the match. Marciniak has been a FIFA referee since 2011, and officiated at UEFA Euro 2016 and the 2018 FIFA World Cup. He was joined by his fellow countrymen, with Paweł Sokolnicki and Tomasz Listkiewicz as assistant referees, Paweł Raczkowski and Tomasz Musiał as additional assistant referees, and Radosław Siejka as reserve assistant referee. The fourth official for the match was Romanian Ovidiu Hațegan.

Details
The Champions League winners were designated as the "home" team for administrative purposes.

Statistics

See also
2018 UEFA Champions League Final
2018 UEFA Europa League Final
2014 UEFA Champions League Final – contested by the same sides
2016 UEFA Champions League Final – contested by the same sides
Atlético Madrid in European football
Real Madrid CF in international football competitions
Spanish football clubs in international competitions

Notes

References

External links

2018 UEFA Super Cup: Tallinn, UEFA.com

2018
Super Cup
Super Cup 2018
Super Cup
Super Cup 2018
Real Madrid CF matches
Atlético Madrid matches
2018–19 in Spanish football
August 2018 sports events in Europe
21st century in Tallinn
Madrid Derby matches